Henrique Feist is a Portuguese singer, actor and director. He is married to Ricardo Spínola.

Early career
Feist was born in Lisbon, Portugal and began his career as a pop singer in 1982 with his brother, performing on television and various radio shows.  They recorded nine records, all of which hit the charts.  In 1985 he created the role of Miguel in the Portuguese television soap Pedro e Paulina.  That same year he was awarded the Best Newcomer Award by the Portuguese National Press.  For the next five years he toured Portugal with his brother and began his singing training with Maria João Serrão from the Portuguese National Opera.

Theatre training
Deciding to continue his studies in theatre he moved to England where he completed the three-year Musical Theatre course at the Guildford School of Acting. Work at drama college includes: Ciccio in The Most Happy Fella; Sancho in Man of La Mancha; Mr. Snow in Carousel as well as master classes with Martin Koch, Claire Moore and Morag McLaren. 

He obtained his stage fighting certificate, the Trinity College of Music singing diploma and 1st prize in the Surrey Annual Music Festival.
He returned to his native Portugal from the UK in 1993.

Selected work

Television
 MC in Cabaret
 Algernon in The Importance of Being Earnest
 David e Silva in The Hour of Freedom
 Singing in the Channel One TV show Saturday Night Live, including the roles:
 Javert (Les Misérables)
 Chris (Miss Saigon)
 Joe (Sunset Boulevard)
 Jesus (Jesus Christ Superstar)
 The Phantom (The Phantom of the Opera).

Feist translated and adapted for Portuguese television the comedy series Rising Damp and Three's Company.

For Channel 3 television, he was vocal and content director, as well as co-starring in, the television galas:
 The Sixties
 Summertime
 The Movies
As well as artistic and creative director and starring in the following live-on-tape gala performances:
 The Great Broad Way
 Latin Blood
 Channel 3 13th Anniversary Gala Performance
As well as artistic and creative director of:
 Channel 3 20th Anniversary Gala Performance
 18th and 19th Golden Globe Awards Ceremony

He created, directed and starred in the gala Marco Paulo – A 40 year tribute for Channel 1 television.

He was also lead singer in the show Music from the Heart, for Channel 1 television, also released on CD.

Artistic director for the Channel 3 musical contest "Superstar Family".

Staged and starred in "Um País Chamado Simone" – a 50 year in showbusiness tribute to Simone de Oliveira for Channel 1 television.

Artistic Director for the Portuguese Song Festival 2008, 2009 and 2014, Channel One Television.

Musical Consultant for the TV Game Show "Singing Bee", Channel 3 Television.

Artistic Director for "Somos Portugal" for Channel 4 TV.

Artistic Consultant for the Channel 3 Game Show "Anything Goes"

Voice acting
 Dragon Ball
 Biker Mice from Mars
 Dead End: Paranormal Park
 Dexter's Lab
 Power Rangers
 Veggie Tales
 All Dogs go to Heaven (also Music director)
 Dimitri (singing) in Anastasia
 Radcliff in Pocahontas
 Kovu in The Lion King II
 Prince in Snow White
 Ramses in The Prince of Egypt
 Joseph (singing) in Joseph, King of Dreams
 Beast in Beauty and the Beast
 Joseph (singing) in The Nativity Story
 Edward (singing) in Enchanted
 Flynn (singing) in Tangled
 Gary in "The Muppets".
 Olaf in "Frozen".
 Caleb (singing) in Abc and Magic
He also dubbed Elton John in the Portuguese versions of El Dorado and "Gnomeo and Juliet".
He has recorded many songs for Disney on Ice.

Stage
 Salo in Maldita Cocaína
 Daniel in My Night With Reg
 Tobias in Sweeney Todd 1997 and again in 2007
 Sam Jenkins / Senator Carver Jones in Of Thee I Sing
 Alain Oulman in Amália, in Lisbon and on tour (also associate director and musical supervisor)
 Emcee in Cabaret
 Mr.Zero in The Adding Machine
Played the lead in "Fado – A People's History" and "The Best of La Féria", both at the Estoril Casino.

Feist created, directed and participated in the following shows:
Esta Vida é uma Cantiga (Life is a Song), a celebration of Portuguese revue and vaudeville
Christmas at the Coliseum
La Noche que me Quieras, celebrating Spanish, Italian and French music.
 501 Years of Dance at the Lisbon Coliseum

He was vocal director and starred in
The Great Composers of the American Musical Theatre, celebrating the music of Gershwin, Porter, Berlin, Kern and Rodgers
A Return to Broadway, both in Lisbon and the Azores island.

He directed and translated the Off-Broadway hit Naked Boys Singing at the Estoril Casino, for which he won the 2009 Rainbow Award, a distinction given to those who fight for a more open democracy. This show had yet another sold-out run in 2015.

In the summer of 2006 Feist presented his show How Broadway Got To Portugal at the Figueira Casino and created the show Xmas Forever for Rádio Renascença's gala performance at the Trindade Theatre.  At Christmas of the same year, he was special guest star for Channel 3 Television Disney Gala Performance. In 2009, Henrique was nominated for a Golden Globe in the category of Best Actor for his role as Emcee in Cabaret. In 2010, he won the SPA Best Actor Award for his role as Mr.Zero in The Adding Machine, for which he was also nominated once again for a Golden Globe in the category of Best Actor. In 2010, the INATEL foundation paid hommage to him and to his contribution to the theatre in Portugal. In 2012 he was distinguished with the Golden ASA.
Henrique celebrated his 30-year career with his show "Broadway Baby" touring all over Portugal with sold out houses. In May 2013 he won the Golden Globe for Best Actor in what was his third nomination for his role in "Broadway Baby".
In February 2013 he shared the stage with John Owen Jones, Robyn North and Madalena Alberto in "The Best of the Musicals" at the Lisbon Coliseum, repeating the show in November once again with John Owen Jones, Madalena Alberto and Sofia Escobar.
In June 2014 he sold out the Lisbon Coliseum for three days with his show 74.14. The same show had a sold out run at the Oporto Coliseum in February 2015. 
In March 2015 he was invited by the Estoril Casino (the largest Casino in Europe) to run its theatre.

Teaching
Feist was vocal coach for the Lisbon Youth Theatre, working on the musicals: Camões, Prince of Poets and Man of La Mancha, for which he also wrote the lyrics.  Since 2003, he has worked in close conjunction with the Portuguese Laryngology Association, coordinating voice workshops.  He teaches musical theatre every summer at the Belem Cultural Centre.

Recording credits
 Portuguese version of Pokémon (including translation and directing)
 Disney International Hits
 Amalia – Original Cast Recording
 Great Fados, Great Voices II

Additional
 In 1996 he was invited to sing at the Aga Khan's birthday celebration.
 He reached the finals of the Channel 1 television show Strictly Come Dancing where he came 3rd.
 In September 2009, at the Portuguese anime oriented event, "Anipop", he was the main judge for the contest "Anipop's got talent".

References

External links
 

1972 births
Portuguese pop singers
Portuguese male television actors
Portuguese television directors
Portuguese musical theatre actors
Portuguese male voice actors
Portuguese translators
Living people
People from Lisbon
Portuguese people of German descent
20th-century Portuguese male actors
21st-century Portuguese male actors
20th-century translators
21st-century translators
Golden Globes (Portugal) winners
Portuguese LGBT actors
Portuguese LGBT singers
LGBT television directors